A Lesson Before Dying is a 1999 American made-for-television drama film adapted from the 1993 Ernest J. Gaines novel of the same name. It won the Primetime Emmy Award for Outstanding Television Movie.

Cast and characters
 Don Cheadle – Grant Wiggins
 Cicely Tyson – Tante Lou
 Mekhi Phifer – Jefferson
 Irma P. Hall – Miss Emma
 Brent Jennings – Reverend Ambrose
 Lisa Arrindell Anderson – Vivian Baptiste
 Frank Hoyt Taylor – Sheriff Guidry
 Stuart Culpepper – Henri Pichot
 Patty Mack – Inez
 Elijah Kelley – Clarence
 Wynton Yates – Louis Washington
 Clay Chappell – Paul
 Cierra Meche – Estelle

References

External links
 
 

1999 television films
1999 films
1999 drama films
Films set in the 20th century
Television shows based on American novels
Primetime Emmy Award for Outstanding Made for Television Movie winners
HBO Films films
Films directed by Joseph Sargent
American drama television films
1990s English-language films
1990s American films